The English progressive rock band Yes has toured for five decades.

The band played live from its creation in summer 1968. Their first overseas shows were in Belgium and the Netherlands in June 1969. They played regularly through December 1980, with the band splitting up early the next year. The band reformed in 1983, and regular tours resumed in 1984 and continued over the next few decades. The longest break in touring came from late 2004 through late 2008. Touring has tended to focus on the UK and the rest of Europe, North America and Japan, but the band have also played other parts of the world, notably Australia.

Early shows
Band:
 Jon Anderson
 Peter Banks
 Bill Bruford, or Tony O'Reilly (September–November 1968)
 Tony Kaye
 Chris Squire

Songs played in this period:

 "Astral Traveller" (Jon Anderson)
 "No Opportunity Necessary, No Experience Needed" (Richie Havens) (originally by Havens in 1968)
 "Carpet Man" (Jim Webb) (originally by The 5th Dimension in 1967)
 "Dear Father" (Anderson, Chris Squire)
 "The Prophet" (Anderson, Squire)
 "Sweet Dreams" (Anderson, David Foster)
 "Clear Days" (Anderson)
 "Then" (Anderson)
 "Beyond and Before" (Squire, Clive Bailey)
 "Everydays" (Stephen Stills) (originally by Buffalo Springfield in 1967)
 "Sweetness" (Anderson, Bailey, Squire)
 "I See You" (Roger McGuinn, David Crosby) (originally by The Byrds in 1966)
 "Time and a Word" (Anderson, Foster)
 "Every Little Thing" (Lennon–McCartney) (originally by The Beatles in 1964)
 "Looking Around" (Anderson, Squire)
 "For Everyone" (Anderson, Squire)
 "It's Love" (Felix Cavaliere, Eddie Brigati) (originally by The Young Rascals in 1966)
 "In the Midnight Hour" (Wilson Pickett, Steve Cropper) (originally by Pickett in 1965)
 "Eleanor Rigby" (Lennon–McCartney) (originally by the Beatles in 1966)
 "Something's Coming" (Leonard Bernstein, Stephen Sondheim) (from the Broadway musical West Side Story in 1957)

Guitarist Peter Banks was fired from the band after the gig at Luton College on 18 April 1970. The last shows were cancelled due to lack of a guitarist.

The Yes Album Tour

Band:
 Jon Anderson
 Bill Bruford
 Steve Howe
 Tony Kaye
 Chris Squire

Fragile Tour

Band:
 Jon Anderson
 Bill Bruford
 Steve Howe
 Chris Squire
 Rick Wakeman

Close to the Edge Tour

Band:
 Jon Anderson
 Steve Howe
 Chris Squire
 Rick Wakeman
 Alan White

Tales from Topographic Oceans Tour

Band:
 Jon Anderson
 Steve Howe
 Chris Squire
 Rick Wakeman
 Alan White

Setlist:

 "Siberian Khatru" (Anderson, Howe, Wakeman)
 "And You and I" (Anderson, Howe, Bruford, Squire)
 "Close to the Edge" (Anderson, Howe)
 Wakeman solo (Wakeman)
 sometimes omitted 
 "The Revealing Science of God (Dance of the Dawn)" (Anderson, Squire, Howe, Wakeman, Alan White)
 "The Remembering (High the Memory)" (Anderson, Squire, Howe, Wakeman, White) (Dropped after 28 February 1974)
 "The Ancient (Giants Under the Sun)" (Anderson, Squire, Howe, Wakeman, White) ("People started falling asleep around side three", Squire recalled, "but you had to stick with it.")
 "Ritual (Nous Sommes du Soleil)" (Anderson, Squire, Howe, Wakeman, White)
 "Heart of the Sunrise" (Anderson, Squire, Bruford) (Dropped after 29 November 1973)
ENCORE:
 "Roundabout" (Anderson, Howe)
 "Starship Trooper" (Anderson, Squire, Howe) (Added on 27 February 1974)

Also occasionally played was:

 "Yours Is No Disgrace" (Played on 21 November 1973, 1 and 3 December 1973, and 14, 16, and 25 February 1974)
 "Firebird Suite" (Played on 28 February 1974 and 21 April 1974)
 "Heart of the Sunrise" (Played on 16, 17, 18, 19, 27, 29 November 1973)

Relayer Tour

Band:
 Jon Anderson
 Steve Howe
 Chris Squire
 Patrick Moraz
 Alan White
Setlist:

 "Sound Chaser" (Anderson, Squire, Howe, White, Moraz)
 "Close to the Edge" (Anderson, Howe)
 "To Be Over" (Anderson, Squire, Howe, White, Moraz)
 "The Gates of Delirium" (Anderson, Squire, Howe, White, Moraz)
 "I've Seen All Good People" (Anderson) (Added starting on 15 April 1975, "Your Move" section only)
 "Mood for a Day" (Howe) (Added starting on 15 April 1975)
 "Long Distance Runaround" (Anderson) (Added starting on 15 April 1975)
 Patrick Moraz keyboard solo (Added starting on 15 April 1975)
 "Clap" (Howe) (Added starting on 15 April 1975)
 "And You and I" (Anderson, Squire, Bruford, Howe)
 "Ritual (Nous Sommes du Soleil)" (Anderson, Squire, Howe, Wakeman, White)
 "Siberian Khatru" (Anderson, Howe, Wakeman) (Dropped after 18 November 1974)
 "Roundabout" (Anderson, Howe)
 "Sweet Dreams" (Anderson, Foster) (Added starting on 15 April 1975)
Other songs played a few times were:
 "Leaves of Green" (Anderson, Squire, Howe, Wakeman, White) (Played on 23 August 1975)
 "South Side of the Sky" (Anderson, Squire) (Played on 5 and 17 December 1974)
 "Yours Is No Disgrace" (Anderson, Squire, Howe, Kaye, Bruford) (Played on 10 May and 9 July 1975)
 "Starship Trooper" (Anderson, Squire, Howe) (Played on 22, 23, 24, and 25 July 1975)
 "High Vibration" (Anderson, Howe) (early version of "Awaken") (Played on 21 July and 23 August 1975)
Covers:
 "Heigh Ho" (Churchill, Morey) originally from the 1937 film Snow White and the Seven Dwarves (Played on 25 June 1975)
 "I'm Down" (Beatles song) (Played on 19 July 1975)
 "Don't Be Cruel" (Elvis song) (Played on 6 July 1975)

1976 Solo Albums Tour

Band:
 Jon Anderson
 Steve Howe
 Chris Squire
 Patrick Moraz
 Alan White

Setlist:

 "Apocalypse" (Anderson, Squire, Howe, Bruford) 
 "Siberian Khatru" (Anderson, Howe, Wakeman)
 "Sound Chaser" (Anderson, Squire, Howe, White, Moraz)
 "I've Seen All Good People" (Anderson, Squire)
 "Hold Out Your Hand/You by My Side" (Squire) from Chris Squire's 1975 solo album Fish Out of Water (Dropped after 6 June 1976)
 "Leaves of Green" (Anderson, Squire, Howe, Wakeman, White) (Between 1 June 1976 and 8 June 1976)
 "On Wings of Gold" based on "Winter" by Vivaldi (Added on 22 June 1976)
 "Break Away from It All" (Howe) from Steve Howe's 1975 solo album Beginnings (Replaced by "Clap" (Howe) after 31 May 1976)
 "Ram" (Howe) from Beginnings (Dropped after 31 May 1976)
 "Beginnings" (Howe) from Beginnings (Dropped after 31 May 1976)
 Alan White solo (White) including "One Way Rag" (Colin Gibson, Kenny Craddock) from his 1976 solo album Ramshackled (Dropped after 31 May 1976)
 "Song of Innocence" (William Blake, Pete Kirtley) from Ramshackled (Dropped after 6 June 1976)
 "Cachaça (Baião)" (Moraz) from Patrick Moraz's 1976 solo album The Story of I (Dropped after 31 May 1976)
 "Long Distance Runaround" (Anderson) (Added on 1 June 1976)
 "Grand Canyon Suite" (Moraz keyboard solo) (Added on 1 June 1976)
 Harp solo
 "Heart of the Sunrise" (Anderson, Squire, Bruford)
 "Ritual (Nous Sommes du Soleil)" (Anderson, Squire, Howe, Wakeman, White) (Added on 8 June 1976)
 "The Gates of Delirium" (Anderson, Howe, Moraz, Squire, White)
 "Roundabout" (Anderson, Howe)
 "Sweet Dreams" (Anderson, Foster) (Dropped after 8 June 1976)
Also played occasionally were:
 "Ocean Song" (Anderson) from Jon Anderson's 1976 solo album Olias of Sunhillow (Recording preceded "Apocalypse" on 26 June 1976)
 "Wonderous Stories" (Anderson) (Played on 6 June 1976)
 "Close to the Edge" (Anderson, Howe) (Replaced "Ritual" on 23 July and 28 July 1976)
 "In the Midnight Hour" (Wilson Pickett, Steve Cropper) (Played on 3 August 1976)
 "Starship Trooper" (Anderson, Squire, Howe) (Played on 8, 13, 16, 19, 20, and 21 June 1976, 17, 20, 28, 30, and 31 July 1976, and 7 August 1976)
 "The Remembering (High the Memory)" (Anderson, Howe, Squire, Wakeman, White) (Replaced "The Gates of Delirium" on 30 July and 31 July 1976)
 "I'm Down" (Lennon, McCartney) originally by the Beatles in 1965 (Played on 3, 6, 12, 17, 18, and 22 June 1976, 18, 20, 27, and 28 July 1976, and 1 August 1976)
 "Yours Is No Disgrace" (Anderson, Squire, Howe, Bruford, Kaye) (Played on 25 June 1976)
 "Every Little Thing" (Lennon, McCartney) (Played on 11 August 1976)

Box office score data

Going for the One Tour

Band:
 Jon Anderson
 Steve Howe
 Chris Squire
 Rick Wakeman
 Alan White

Setlist:

 "Parallels" (Squire)
 "I've Seen All Good People" (Anderson, Squire)
 "Close to the Edge" (Anderson, Howe)
 "Wonderous Stories"
 "Turn of the Century" (Anderson, Howe, White)
 "Count Your Blessings" (Anderson) (Between 17 and 23 September 1977)
 "And You and I" (Anderson, Squire, Howe, Bruford)
 "Ram" (Howe) (Dropped after 31 July 1977)
 "Going for the One" (Added on 22 August 1977)
 "Flight Jam" (Anderson)
 "Awaken" (Anderson, Howe)
 "Roundabout" (Anderson, Howe)
 "Starship Trooper" (Anderson, Squire, Howe) or "Yours Is No Disgrace" (Anderson, Squire, Howe, Kaye, Bruford), sometimes both
Also played occasionally were:
 "Colours of the Rainbow" (Bricusse, Newley) (Played on 30, 31 July 1977, 1, 2, 3, 5, 6, 7, 12, 13, 14, 15 August 1977, 17, 18, 19, 21, 22, 23 September, 12 November 1977, and 5 December 1977)
 "Siberian Khatru" (Anderson, Howe, Wakeman) (Replaced "Awaken" on 31 August 1977)
 "Leaves of Green" (Anderson, Howe, Squire, Wakeman, White) (On 25 and 26 August 1977)
 "Ritual (Nous Sommes du Soleil)" (Anderson, Squire, Howe, Wakeman, White) (Played on 21 November 1977, 2, 4, 5, and 6 December 1977)
 "Bremen Boogie" (Replaced Tour Song on 27 November 1977)
Covers:
 "In the Midnight Hour" (Picket, Cropper) (Played on 23 September 1977)
 "Ram" (Played on 30 and 31 July 1977)
 "Beautiful Lang" (Played on 10 August and 26 September 1977)
 "

Box office score data

Tormato Tour

Band:
 Jon Anderson
 Steve Howe
 Chris Squire
 Rick Wakeman
 Alan White

Setlist:

 "Siberian Khatru" (Anderson, Howe, Wakeman)
 "Heart of the Sunrise" (Anderson, Squire, Bruford)
 "Future Times/Rejoice" (Anderson, Squire, Howe, Wakeman, White)
 "Circus of Heaven" (Anderson)
 "The Big Medley" (Anderson, Squire, Foster)
 "Time and a Word"
 "Long Distance Runaround"
 "Survival"
 "The Fish (Schindleria Praematurus)"
 "Perpetual Change"
 "Soon"
 "Release, Release" (Anderson, White, Squire) (Dropped after 3 September 1978)
 "Don't Kill the Whale" (Anderson, Squire) (Dropped after 18 April 1979)
 "Clap" (Howe)
 "Arriving UFO" (Anderson, Howe, Wakeman) (Added on 18 June 1979)
 "On the Silent Wings of Freedom" (Anderson, Squire) (Replaced by "And You and I" (Anderson, Howe, Bruford, Squire) starting on 20 April 1979)
 Wakeman solo (Wakeman)
 "Flight Jam" (Anderson)
 "Awaken" (Anderson, Howe)
 "Leaves of Green" (Anderson, Squire, Howe, Wakeman, White) (Added on 18 June 1979)
 "I've Seen All Good People" (Anderson, Squire)
 "Roundabout" (Anderson, Squire)
Other songs occasionally played were:
 "Madrigal" (Anderson, Wakeman)
 "Close to the Edge" (Anderson, Howe) (Played on 20, 21, and 22 April 1979)
 "Going for the One" (Played on 29 August 1978)
 "In the Midnight Hour" (Pickett, Cropper) (Played on 17 September 1978)
 "Your Move" (Played on 26 April 1979)
 "Vevey" (Played on 29 August 1978)
 "Release, Release" (Played on 28, 29, 30, 31 August 1978, 1, 2 September 1978)
 "Kansas City Witch" (Played on 27, 28, 29, 30 September 1978, 1, 3, 4 October 1978)
 "Parallels" (Squire) (Played on 28, 29, 30, 31 August 1978, 3, 4, 6, 7, 8 September 1978)
 "

See also 
 List of Yes concert tours (1980s–90s)
 List of Yes concert tours (2000s–10s)
 List of Yes concert tours (2020s)

References

External links
 Yesworld: The Official Yes website Past & present versions
 Forgotten Yesterdays (A Comprehensive Guide To Yes Shows)

1960s
1960s-related lists
1970s-related lists
Yes